Marie Paradis (1778 – 1839) was the first woman to climb Mont Blanc.

Paradis was a poor maidservant who lived in Chamonix at that time part of the Kingdom of Sardinia. On 14 July 1808, in the company of renowned mountain guide Jacques Balmat, she became the first woman to climb Mont Blanc, Western Europe's highest mountain. The party camped on the Grands Mulets, and during the final ascent Paradis became fatigued and was assisted by her guides. On the summit, Paradis was in such poor condition that she had difficulty breathing, was unable to speak, and could not see. Exhausted and quite undone by her efforts, she begged her companions to throw her into the nearest crevasse to end her misery. Mark Twain reports that she took her boyfriend with her, a detail not found in other sources. In 1809 she recorded her experience in an "admirably graphic and picturesque" account. Le Blond reports that Paradis made "quite a fortune" out of her achievement.

Afterwards she was known as "Maria de Mont Blanc"; Charles Edward Mathews notes, in The Annals of Mont Blanc, that after her own successful climb she would leave refreshments for others who attempted Mont Blanc. The second woman to climb Mont Blanc did so thirty years after her; when Henriette d'Angeville celebrated her successful ascent in Chamonix, she was congratulated by Paradis who had received her special, personal invitation.

References

Bibliography

1778 births
1839 deaths
Kingdom of Sardinia mountain climbers
Female climbers